Doomsday Party is a 2013 Hong Kong drama film directed by newcomer Ho Hong and featuring an ensemble cast including Paul Wong, Kay Tse, Kelvin Kwan, Teddy Robin and Wilfred Lau.

Plot 

The film opens with scenes of angry protests in front of Hong Kong's LegCo building. Following a double bomb scare, police attempt to disperse the crowd, only to fuel further rage. A few blocks away, Lang (Kelvin Kwan) and his acolyte Fish (Fish Liew) take advantage of the surrounding chaos to hold up a bank. Armed with a pistol and makeshift bombs, they threaten employees and customers, among whom police detective Kin-Ho (Paul Wong), celebrity English tutor Victor Lo (Wilfred Lau), bank clerk Wan Yee (Kay Tse), councillor Ho (KK Cheung), his mistress Rebecca (Maggie Chan), and an old man clinging to a mysterious envelope (Teddy Robin).

After the opening credits, the action goes back in time to follow the intertwining lives of these eight characters.

Reception 

In the South China Morning Post, Yvette Leh rated the film 3/5, stating "Ho, who directed, wrote and co-produced the film, is to be commended for an ambitious work packed with substantive content and believable characters." Clarence Tsui of The Hollywood Reporter showed less enthusiasm: "the initial rage against Hong Kong's ruling machine ... quickly dissipates to reveal clichéd romantic or familial melodrama".

References

External links 
 

2013 films
Hong Kong drama films
2013 drama films
Films set in Hong Kong
Films shot in Hong Kong
2010s Hong Kong films